Kim Dae-Ho (born 15 May 1988) is a South Korean footballer who plays for Suwon FC

References

1988 births
Living people
Association football forwards
South Korean footballers
Pohang Steelers players
Ansan Mugunghwa FC players
Suwon FC players
K League 1 players
K League 2 players